The Ovens Natural Park  in Feltzen South is part of the fairhaven site of a Gold Rush over a century ago.  "The Ovens Natural Park" is a privately owned 190 acre pristine reserve of coastal forest, located on the Atlantic coast of Nova Scotia, along the scenic Lighthouse Route. For hundreds of years, people have been drawn to the incredible beauty, diverse geography, spiritual solace, and fascinating history that make "The Ovens Natural Park" so unique. Every year,  park visitors hike the spectacular trails along the cliffs to view the famous sea caves, or "Ovens" for which the park was named.  The park is located at the meeting point of Lunenburg and Rose Bay in Lunenburg County. The Ovens is currently owned by the Chapin Family.

Gallery

References

External links 
 Ovens Park Website 
 Chapin Family Web Site
Municipality of the District of Lunenburg

Communities in Lunenburg County, Nova Scotia
General Service Areas in Nova Scotia